Neville Myton (28 May 1946 – 19 May 2021) was a Jamaican middle distance runner who competed in the 1964 Summer Olympics and in the 1968 Summer Olympics. He was a double gold medallist at the 1966 Central American and Caribbean Games, taking the individual 800 metres title and also sharing in the team gold medals with the Jamaican 4×400 metres relay team. He won a bronze medal in the 4×400 metre relay at the 1967 Pan American Games.

Myton set a national junior record in Jamaica when he finished the 800m race in 1:47.2 minutes at the 1964 Olympics. At the time of his death, this record still stood.

He also competed in the 1500 metres, taking a silver at the 1964 British West Indies Championships and gold at the 1965 British West Indies Championships.

Myton resided in Florida until his death, with his wife Joy.

References

1946 births
2021 deaths
Jamaican male middle-distance runners
Olympic athletes of Jamaica
Athletes (track and field) at the 1964 Summer Olympics
Athletes (track and field) at the 1968 Summer Olympics
Pan American Games bronze medalists for Jamaica
Pan American Games medalists in athletics (track and field)
Athletes (track and field) at the 1966 British Empire and Commonwealth Games
Athletes (track and field) at the 1967 Pan American Games
Competitors at the 1966 Central American and Caribbean Games
Athletes (track and field) at the 1970 British Commonwealth Games
Central American and Caribbean Games gold medalists for Jamaica
Central American and Caribbean Games medalists in athletics
Medalists at the 1967 Pan American Games
Commonwealth Games competitors for Jamaica